Simeon López is a former mayor of Belmopan, the capital of Belize. He is a member of the United Democratic Party (UDP); in 2006, he was elected as mayor, and also became vice president of the Belize Mayors' Association. Marconi Sosa, Benque Viejo del Carmen's mayor, succeeded him as that organization's vice president in 2007.

López was succeeded as Belmopan mayor in 2015 by Khalid Belisle, also of the UDP.

References

External links
https://web.archive.org/web/20071008185930/http://www.udp.org.bz/Belmopan%20City%20Council.htm
http://sanpedrosun.net/old/06-141.html

Year of birth missing (living people)
Mayors of Belmopan
United Democratic Party (Belize) politicians
Living people
People from Belmopan